Kanya Rattanapetch (born November 2, 1989) in Thailand, is a Thai model and actress. She is best known for her role in the 2007 film, Love of Siam as Ying.

Biography
Kanya Rattanapetch was born in Bangkok, Thailand. She is currently studies master's degree at Bangkok University.

Acting career
Her acting career started when she was 13 or 14 years old, and she was seen first in 2005 Thai Horror Film Scared(Rab Nong Sayong Kwan)  as Tarn. Aside from acting she was also in the field of modeling. She did two more films Mor.8  in 2006 and Sick Nurses in 2007. She rose to fame when she played the martyr girl named 'Ying' in the most acclaimed Thai film Love of Siam (Rak Haeng Sayam).

The year after she started getting supporting roles for TV Series / Lakorn from 3 major TV Station in Thailand. She was first cast in Ch.5's Sitcom Ruk Rhythm. After the sitcom she was cast at ch.3' Lakorn 'Ruk Sorn Kaen', then 2009, she got a role as Noodee in a Lakorn titled 'Mea Luang' in ch.7 (Ch.3's rival network). After that series Kanya is back at ch.3 for 'Sapai Glai Peun Tiang' which is currently airing in Thailand. She will be back in ch.7 for a Lakorn where she will play in a lead role. The tentative title of the said Lakorn is 'Coke E-Ling Hansa'.

Aside from that, after her performance in the Love of Siam, she was chosen to be WAN's leading lady for his single's music video for "Safe Distance". the song and the music video itself topped charts Thailand due to the chemistry between Kanya and Wan. It was proceeded with another music video for WAN's next single 'What the Rest'. The music video follows the story from the 1st video, yet ended in a sad end. Kanya was also featured in 2 music videos of the Thai band "AM Fine" where she acted a rocker-emo who fell in love with a guy who loves someone else.

In 2008, she made another movie titled 4 Romance alongside her fellow cast in the Love of Siam, Mario Maurer and Witwisit Hiranyawongkul. The three actors were not actually seen in a same scene because they all have their lead roles in three different segments of the film. Witwisit is in the segment 'Dream', Mario in 'Kiss' and Kanya in segment 'Shy'.

Filmography

TV Series / Lakorn

Awards and nominations

Other appearances
Kanya also did star in 2 music videos, one for the thai singer WAN and another  for the Thai band AM Fine. which both was proceeded by a sequel.

Music Videos with WAN
Safe Distance:AF2 (Wan: Soloist).
What the Rest:AF2 (Wan: Soloist).

Music Videos for Am Fine Band
Chan Di Mai Pho Due Thoe Mai Pho Sak Thi by Am Fine.
Fear Night by Am Fine.

Advertisements
Heartbeat Candy
Government Savings Bank GSB

References

External links

 
 

1989 births
Living people
Kanya Rattanapetch
Kanya Rattanapetch
Kanya Rattanapetch
Kanya Rattanapetch
Kanya Rattanapetch
Kanya Rattanapetch